Asmund Eirik Soelseth (born 22 August 1886) was a Norwegian judge.

He was born in Vadsø to Svend Soelseth and Anna Erika Bakke. He graduated as cand.jur. in 1910, and was named as a Supreme Court Justice from 1946 to 1956. He was decorated Commander of the Order of St. Olav in 1953.

References

1886 births
Year of death missing
People from Vadsø
Supreme Court of Norway justices